Sawlon of Mohnyin (1486–1533) was saopha of the Shan state of Mohnyin in the early the 16th century. He is best remembered in Burmese history as the conqueror of Ava Kingdom.

Sawlon led a confederation of Shan states, and raided Avan territory throughout the first quarter of the 16th century. (The earliest reported date in the Burmese chronicles of a raid led by Sawlon of Mohnyin came in 1502. It is unclear if the Sawlon in 1502 was this Sawlon who would have been only 16 years old, then. The Sawlon in 1502 may have been Sawlon's father.)

By the 1520s, his confederation included Shan states of Kale (Kalay), Momeik, Bhamo as well as the Burman Kingdom of Prome (Pyay). The allies accelerated their concerted attacks on Ava from all directions, and sacked Ava in 1524. But King Shwenankyawshin of Ava and his ally Hkonmaing I of Onbaung–Hsipaw continued their resistance. In 1527, his forces again laid siege to Ava where Shwenankyawshin fell in battle. Sawlon placed his son on the Ava throne, ending Ava's 163-year reign of Upper Burma. Ava became just another Shan state, and many Burmans fled to Toungoo.

Sawlon made a fateful choice of not attacking Toungoo Kingdom in the southeast of Ava. Instead, he chose to attack his erstwhile ally Prome for he was unsatisfied with the assistance he received from his ally King Thado Minsaw of Prome in their war against Ava. In late 1532, Sawlon and Thohanbwa marched south and captured Prome. After the conquest of Prome, Sawlon was murdered by his own ministers on his way back home to Mohnyin.

Notes

References

Bibliography
 
 
 
 

Ava dynasty
1486 births
1533 deaths
16th-century Burmese monarchs